Founded in 1991, Text Control is a vendor of word processing and reporting components for Microsoft development technologies. The software company also publishes TX Text Control Express, a free RichTextBox replacement component for the .NET Framework.

Their products are used by developers for integrating word processing and reporting functions in business applications for platforms that include Windows Forms, Windows Presentation Foundation, ActiveX and ASP.NET.

SD Times included Text Control into its SD Times 100 list, which honors "innovators and leaders" in the software development industry, in the category User Experience for 2012-2015 and Components for 2011.

The company (Text Control GmbH), based in Bremen, Germany was established as a corporate spin-off in August 2010 from the company The Imaging Source Europe GmbH. Besides its German headquarters in Bremen, Text Control has offices and agencies in the Charlotte, North Carolina, United States (dba Text Control, LLC) and Taipei, Taiwan.

Partnership 

Text Control is a Microsoft Visual Studio Industry Partner and an Embarcadero Technology Partner.

See also
List of reporting software

References

External links

Software companies of Germany
Companies based in Bremen
Software companies established in 1991
1991 establishments in Germany